Jaldhaka (also referred to as Jhalong) is a small town in the Gorubathan CD block in the Kalimpong Sadar subdivision of the Kalimpong district  in the state of West Bengal, India. It lies on the bank of Jaldhaka River.

Geography

Location

Jaldhaka is shown as being a part of Paten Godak Khasmahal mouza in the map of Gorubathan CD block on page 197 of District Statistical Handbook, Darjeeling, 2011.

Area overview
The map alongside shows the Kalimpong Sadar subdivision of Kalimpong district. This region is characterized by abruptly rising hills and numerous small streams. It is an predominantly rural area with 77.67% of the population living in rural areas and only 22.23% living in the urban areas. While Kalimpong is the only municipality, Dungra is the sole census town in the entire area. The economy is agro-based and there are 6 tea gardens in the Gorubathan CD block. In 2011, Kalimpong subdivision had a literacy rate of 81.85%, comparable with the highest levels of literacy in the districts of the state. While the first degree college in the subdivision was established at Kalimpong in 1962 the entire subdivision (and now the entire district), other than the head-quarters, had to wait until as late as 2015 (more than half a century) to have their first degree colleges at Pedong and Gorubathan.

Note: The map alongside presents some of the notable locations in the subdivision. All places marked in the map are linked in the larger full screen map.

Police station
Jaldhaka police station has jurisdiction over Gorubathan and Kalimpong II CD blocks.

Economy
Jaldhaka Hydroelectric Power Project has a design capacity of 27 MWe. It has five units, the first was commissioned in 1967 and the last in 1983. It is operated by the West Bengal State Electricity Distribution Company. In the stage I it had 3 x 9 = 27 MW and in stage II it had 2 x4 = 8 MW capacity.

Healthcare
There is a primary health centre, with 2 beds, at Jaldhaka.

References

Villages in Kalimpong district